Jorge Gabriel Vázquez (born 28 November 1969) is an Argentine former footballer and manager who played for clubs in Argentina, Chile, Mexico, Bolivia, Ecuador and United States. He played as a midfielder.

Career
Born in Buenos Aires, Argentina, Vázquez began playing football for local side River Plate. He also played for rivals Club Atlético Vélez Sársfield.

Vázquez had a brief spell with Mexican Primera División side Monarcas Morelia in 1996.

He finished his playing career in the United States, making four MLS appearances for the New England Revolution before being traded to the Kansas City Wizards in August 2003.

After he retired from playing, Vázquez became a football coach. His first job as manager was with Torneo Argentino A side Sportivo Desamparados in 2009.

Teams
  River Plate 1989-1991
  Vélez Sársfield 1991-1992
  River Plate 1992-1993
  Universidad Católica 1993-1994
  Emelec 1995
  Morelia 1996
  Gimnasia y Tiro de Salta 1997-1999
  All Boys 2000-2001
  Oriente Petrolero 2001
  San Martín de Tucumán 2002
  Atlanta 2002
  New England Revolution 2003
  Kansas City Wizards 2003

Titles
  River Plate 1989/90 (Primera División Argentina Championship)
  Universidad Católica 1994 (Interamericana Cup)

References

External links
 Profile at BDFA 

1969 births
Living people
Argentine footballers
Argentine expatriate footballers
Club Atlético Vélez Sarsfield footballers
Gimnasia y Tiro footballers
San Martín de Tucumán footballers
Club Atlético River Plate footballers
Club Atlético Atlanta footballers
All Boys footballers
C.S. Emelec footballers
Atlético Morelia players
Sporting Kansas City players
New England Revolution players
Club Deportivo Universidad Católica footballers
Chilean Primera División players
Argentine Primera División players
Liga MX players
Major League Soccer players
Expatriate footballers in Chile
Expatriate footballers in Mexico
Expatriate footballers in Bolivia
Expatriate footballers in Ecuador
Expatriate soccer players in the United States
Association football midfielders
Footballers from Buenos Aires